Emerald Lilly Fennell (born 1 October 1985) is an English actress, filmmaker, and writer. She has received many awards and nominations, including an Academy Award, two British Academy Film Awards, one Screen Actors Guild Award, and nominations for three Primetime Emmy Awards and three Golden Globe Awards. Fennell first gained attention for her roles in period drama films, such as Albert Nobbs (2011), Anna Karenina (2012), The Danish Girl (2015), and Vita and Virginia (2018). She went on to receive wider recognition for her starring roles in the BBC One period drama series Call the Midwife (2013–2017) and for her portrayal of Camilla Parker-Bowles in the Netflix period drama series The Crown (2019–2020).

As a writer-director, Fennell is known as the showrunner for season two of the BBC thriller series Killing Eve (2019), which earned her two Primetime Emmy Award nominations. In 2020, Fennell made her feature film directorial debut with the thriller Promising Young Woman (2020), for which she won the Academy Award for Best Original Screenplay, and received nominations for Best Picture, and Best Director, becoming one of only seven women, and the first British woman, to be nominated for the latter.

Early life
Born in Hammersmith in London to jewellery designer Theo Fennell and author Louise Fennell ( MacGregor).
Her sister, Coco Fennell, is a fashion designer.

Fennell was educated at Marlborough College, a private school in Marlborough, Wiltshire. She then studied English at Greyfriars, Oxford, where she acted in university plays. There she was spotted by Lindy King of United Agents.

Career

Acting
Fennell appeared in the Channel 4 sitcom Chickens with Simon Bird, Joe Thomas and Jonny Sweet. She then joined the cast of the BBC One series Call the Midwife as Patsy Mount, after dyeing her blonde hair red. She is also known for her film roles in Albert Nobbs (2011), Anna Karenina (2012), The Danish Girl (2015), and Vita & Virginia (2019).

On 23 October 2018, it was revealed that Fennell would play Camilla Shand in the third season of the Netflix series The Crown. She continued playing the role in the fourth season and gained a Primetime Emmy Award nomination for Outstanding Supporting Actress in a Drama Series. Fennell made a brief uncredited appearance in her directorial debut film Promising Young Woman as the host of a 'blowjob lip' make-up tutorial video.

Writing and directing
In 2008, Fennell was commissioned to write a film script (co-produced by Madeleine Lloyd Webber). Titled Chukka, it is a romantic comedy about a group of teenagers who fight the closure of their school by taking on the rich kids at polo.

Her first novel was published by Bloomsbury Children's Books in January 2013: Shiverton Hall, a children's fantasy. In December 2012, it was released as an ebook by Bloomsbury USA.

The Creeper, a sequel, was published mid-2014. ISFDB catalogues them as the Shiverton Hall series. It was shortlisted for the Waterstones Children's Book Prize in 2014. She then released Monsters in September 2015, her first adult horror book.

In July 2018, it was announced that Fennell was hired by her close friend Phoebe Waller-Bridge as head writer for the second season of the BBC series Killing Eve, replacing Waller-Bridge, who remains as a producer. Fennell wrote six episodes for the season. Fennell also become one of the show's executive producers. Speaking to The New York Times, Fennell said "Phoebe [Waller-Bridge] and I had worked together in the past, and we’ve been friends for nearly 10 years. We met on a film — Albert Nobbs — which we both had tiny parts in. I started in the very early days as a writer in the Season 2 writer's room. Because it's such an unusual show, they did a very loose writers' room for a week just to see, and then wonderfully and luckily for me they promoted me to head writer." The second season began broadcast in April 2019. At the 71st Primetime Emmy Awards, Fennell was nominated for a Primetime Emmy Award for Outstanding Writing for a Drama Series for the season 2 episode "Nice and Neat".

In January 2019, it was announced Fennell would write and direct the comedy thriller film Promising Young Woman, starring Carey Mulligan. Production began in March 2019. Fennell was seven months pregnant during the 23-day shoot. The movie premiered at the 2020 Sundance Film Festival to critical acclaim with, as of April 2020, a 91% score on Rotten Tomatoes, and a critical consensus of "A boldly provocative, timely thriller, Promising Young Woman is an auspicious feature debut for writer-director Emerald Fennell -- and a career highlight for Carey Mulligan." She produced the film with, amongst others, Margot Robbie and her LuckyChap Entertainment production company. The film went on to earn five Academy Award nominations, including Best Picture, Best Director, and Best Original Screenplay for Fennell. Fennell became one of only seven women, and the first British woman, to earn a nomination in the directing category. As well, Fennell's directing nomination alongside that of Chloé Zhao marked the first instance of two women earning directing nominations in the same year. For the film, she also received Best Original Screenplay awards at the Critics Choice Awards and the Writers Guild of America Awards. Fennell won the 2021 Academy Award for Best Original Screenplay at the 93rd Academy Awards for Promising Young Woman.

In January 2020, Andrew Lloyd Webber announced he would collaborate with Fennell on the musical Cinderella, which opened in London in August 2021.

On 22 March 2021, Fennell was attached to write a Zatanna film for Warner Brothers, set in the DC Extended Universe.

On 18 May 2021, Mark Millar revealed that Fennell had written the latest screenplay of the film adaptation of his comic Nemesis.

In January 2022, it was announced that Fennell had set her next project as director with Media Rights Capital, with plans to shoot during the summer. In May 2022, Rosamund Pike, Barry Keoghan, and Jacob Elordi joined the project, which was revealed to be titled Saltburn.

Film style 
Fennell's works often touch on the concepts of loving your friends and family, coping with losses, and avenging.Promising Young Woman particularly grasps and displays topics of importance to Emerald Fennell: misogyny, violence against women in sexual contexts, and the harm of the male gaze. Through the use of color schemes and soundtracks, Fennel was able to create a mood and tone that helps to convey the protagonists avenging mindset. The bright pops of pinks and blues within the mise en scène juxtapose Cassie's intentions with her "womanhood." In contrast, warm tones fill the rooms of uncomfortable situations in order to keep the viewers in line with Cassie's comfort level in these scenarios. For the soundtrack, Emerald Fennell used all female artists except one, the composer for the final "Toxic" cover during the climax of the film. It was important to her to keep a female driven film touching on the topics of the #MeToo movement to incorporate female music that reflected her intentions for the film. By highlighting the importance of the film's message, Fennell and her music supervisor were able to get Capitol records to agree to usage while complying with Promising Young Woman's independent budget. Although her first film, Promising Young Woman displays Fennell's style as an auteur and social comentarian.

Personal life
Fennell's husband is film and advertising director and producer Chris Vernon. The couple have a son, born in 2019. She confirmed she was pregnant with their second child at the 93rd Academy Awards in April 2021.

Filmography

Film

Acting roles

Television

Acting roles

Bibliography
 Shiverton Hall (2012)
 The Creeper (2014)
 Rollercoasters Shiverton Hall (2014)
 Monsters (2015)

Awards and nominations

References

External links
 
 
  (under 'Fennell, Emerald' without '1985–', previous page of browse report)

1985 births
Living people
21st-century British screenwriters
21st-century English actresses
21st-century English women writers
Actresses from London
Alumni of Greyfriars, Oxford
Best Original Screenplay Academy Award winners
British women film directors
British women screenwriters
English children's writers
English film actresses
English television actresses
Film directors from London
People educated at Marlborough College
People from Hammersmith
Writers from London